Gfycat is a user-generated short video hosting company founded by Richard Rabbat, Dan McEleney, and Jeff Harris.

History
Founded in 2013 in Edmonton, Canada, Gfycat was among the first web services to offer video encoding of GIFs. It was incorporated in the United States in 2015 and has since raised $12 million in seed funding.

Currently, Gfycat offers a web platform for uploading and hosting short video content, as well as an iMessage app, an Android app, and the GIF Brewery macOS application for GIF and video creation. It also has integrations with Reddit, the messaging app Tango, Microsoft Outlook, Skype, and WordPress, among others. It was a finalist for the 2016 Advertising Age Creativity Awards in the "Startup to Watch" category.

Gfycat currently ranks within the top 57 websites in the U.S by traffic, with over 130 million monthly active users in 2017. Its users are primarily concentrated in English-speaking countries, with a significant foothold in Europe and Latin America. It supports sixteen languages, including English, French, Spanish, Russian, Ukrainian, Japanese, Chinese (traditional and simplified), Korean, and Arabic. Users fall primarily in the 18-35 age range.

Gfycat has offices in Edmonton, Alberta and Palo Alto, California.

In 2018 Gfycat had an alleged data breach; an estimated 8 million accounts were compromised, and its database was put for sale on the Dream Market.

In December 2019, Gfycat started redgifs.com for adult content. On May 12, 2020, Gfycat banned the adult content completely. All the adult content was moved to Redgifs.com and Redgifs was acquired by a new company. As of 2021, short links made before the separation may be resolved by and hosted on redgifs.

Gfycat is currently owned by Snapchat.

References

External links
 
 "Gfycat aims Web giggles at our short attention spans," SF Chronicle
 "Are GIFs the Future of Movie Marketing? 3 Trends That Are Changing the Face of Entertainment," Huffington Post
 "Gfycat hits 130M monthly active users as short form video heats up," Tech Crunch

GIF hosting websites
Internet properties established in 2015
Online mass media companies of the United States
Companies based in Palo Alto, California
American companies established in 2015
Video hosting